Coleslaw (from the Dutch term koolsla meaning 'cabbage salad'), also known as cole slaw, or simply as slaw, is a side dish consisting primarily of finely shredded raw cabbage with a salad dressing or condiment, commonly either vinaigrette or mayonnaise. This dish originated in the Netherlands in the 18th century. Coleslaw prepared with vinaigrette may benefit from the long lifespan granted by pickling.

History 

The term "coleslaw" arose in the 18th century as an anglicisation of the Dutch term "koolsla" ("kool" in Dutch sounds like "cole") meaning "cabbage salad". The "cole" part of the word ultimately derives from the Latin caulis, meaning cabbage.

The 1770 Dutch cookbook The Sensible Cook (Dutch: De Verstandige Kock) contains a recipe attributed to the author's Dutch landlady, who mixed thin strips of cabbage with melted butter, vinegar, and oil. The coleslaw recipe, as it is most commonly prepared, is fairly young, as mayonnaise was invented during the mid-18th century.

According to The Joy of Cooking (1997), raw cabbage is the only entirely consistent ingredient in coleslaw; the type of cabbage, dressing, and added ingredients vary widely. Vinaigrette, mayonnaise, and sour cream-based dressings are all listed; bacon, carrots, bell peppers, pineapple, pickles, onions, and herbs are mentioned explicitly as possible added ingredients.

Variations and similar dishes 

There are many variations of the recipe, which include the addition of other ingredients such as red cabbage, pepper, shredded carrots, onion, grated cheese, pineapple, or apple, mixed with a salad dressing such as mayonnaise or cream. Various seasonings, such as celery seed, may be added. The cabbage may come in finely minced pieces, shredded strips, or small squares. Other slaw variants include broccoli slaw, which uses shredded raw broccoli instead of cabbage. Cream, sour cream, or buttermilk are also popular additions. Buttermilk coleslaw is most commonly found in the southern United States.

Traditional German Krautsalat consists of finely shredded cabbage marinated with oil and vinegar. Sometimes onions or apples are added.

In Israel, a common coleslaw type consists of red cabbage and mayonnaise. It often includes salt, pepper, and lemon juice. The salad is often served as a topping option at food stands. It is also mass-produced and purchased in stores.

Coleslaw with cooked ham and sliced pepper (julienne cut) in Italy is called insalata capricciosa (capricious salad).

In Poland, cabbage-based salads resembling coleslaw are commonly served as a side dish with the second course at dinner, next to meat and potatoes. There is no fixed recipe, but typical ingredients include shredded white cabbage (red and Chinese cabbage are also not uncommon), finely chopped onions, shredded carrots, and parsley or dill leaves, with many possible additions. These are seasoned with salt, black pepper and a pinch of sugar and tossed with a dash of oil (typically sunflower or rapeseed) and vinegar, while mayonnaise-based dressings are uncommon. An alternative, usually served with fried fish, is made with sauerkraut, squeezed to eliminate excess salty brine and similarly tossed with carrots, onions, black pepper, sugar and oil. Any simple salad of that kind, i.e. one made with shredded raw vegetables, is known as a surówka ( 'raw'). If cabbage is the base ingredient, it is called a surówka z (kiszonej) kapusty, or a "(soured) cabbage salad". The English name "coleslaw" is mainly associated with the mayonnaise-dressed cabbage. It is often written as "colesław" or "kolesław", because of the similarity to many names ending with "-sław" (e.g. Bolesław).

In Russia and Ukraine, a salad of fresh shredded cabbage mixed with carrots, apples, cranberries etc., is traditionally dressed with unrefined sunflower oil. The cabbage can be marinated before with vinegar producing cabbage provençal. A similar salad is also made of sauerkraut.

In Sweden, a particular type of cabbage salad made with a vinaigrette consisting of vinegar or acetic acid (vinegar essence), vegetable oil, salt, and seasonings is classically served with pizza and known as pizzasallad (pizza salad). Recipe adds carrots and leeks and is called veckosallad (week salad) for its notable durability. The term coleslaw (or ) is reserved for cabbage salad with carrots and mayonnaise-based dressing and is typically seen as American cuisine.

In the United Kingdom, coleslaw often contains carrot and onion in addition to cabbage and is usually made with mayonnaise or salad cream. Some variations include grated cheese such as cheddar, nuts such as walnuts and dried fruits such as sultanas or raisins.

In the United States, coleslaw often contains buttermilk, mayonnaise or substitutes, and carrot. However, many regional variations exist, and recipes incorporating prepared mustard or vinegar without the dairy and mayonnaise are also common. Barbecue slaw, also known as red slaw, is made using ketchup and vinegar rather than mayonnaise. It is frequently served alongside North Carolina barbecue, including Lexington style barbecue, where, unlike in the rest of the state, a red slaw is the prevailing variety.

See also 

 Sauerkraut
 List of cabbage dishes

References

External links 

 

Brassica oleracea dishes
Cabbage dishes
Cuisine of the Southern United States
Danish cuisine
Dutch cuisine
German cuisine
Pickles
Polish cuisine
Raw foods
Swedish cuisine
New England cuisine
American salads
British salads
Canadian cuisine